The 1926 United States Senate election in Arizona was held  on Tuesday November 3, Incumbent Republican Senator Ralph Cameron ran for re-election on his second term, but was defeated by incumbent Democratic Representative Carl Hayden in the general election. Hayden was the longest-serving Senator having been re-elected to six more terms until he retired in 1968.

Republican primary

Candidates
 Ralph H. Cameron, incumbent U.S. Senator

Democratic primary

Candidates
 Carl T. Hayden, U.S. Congressman of Arizona's at-large Congressional district
 Charles H. Rutherford

Results

General election

Campaign 
Cameron received the support of Republican leaders but only tepid support from rank and file membership. In contrast, his challenger, Congressman Carl Hayden, in turn had a united party, the backing of labor, and the support of the Woman's Christian Temperance Union. Cameron campaigned on a message highlighting his successes during his first term. Democrats countered by highlighting his inability to win a cotton tariff, showing him to be ineffective.

A series of six article written by Hayden supporter Will Irwin was published by the Los Angeles Times in mid-1926. These articles examined Cameron's history with the Grand Canyon and claimed he had salted several claims in the canyon in order to control the valuable sites. Cameron condemned the articles' claims as "malicious fabrications" but the political damage had already been done.  Hayden won the election by a vote of 44,591 to 31,845.

Results

See also 
 United States Senate elections, 1926

References

Bibliography
 

1926
Arizona
United States Senate